Medvėgalis was a 14th-century hill fort in Samogitia, located in present-day Šilalė District Municipality, Lithuania. It was first mentioned in 1316 in written texts and was one of the most important and strongest Lithuanian forts in the area. It was attacked by the Teutonic Knights over 20 times throughout history, including the Siege of Medvėgalis in 1329, when it fell to the Teutonic forces and its defenders were converted to Catholicism.

The settlement at the hill fort complex lies to the southwest and northeast of the fort. It was renovated and adapted to tourists' needs in 2006 by the Varniai Regional Park and the Ministry of Environment. The fort was the subject of a poem by the poet Maironis.

See also
List of hillforts in Lithuania

References 

Hill forts in Lithuania